was a Japanese film critic, theorist and historian.

Overviews 
Born in Niigata, Niigata Prefecture, Japan, He published more than a hundred books on film, and was one of Japan's foremost scholars and historians addressing film. He was recognized as one of the world's foremost authorities on Japanese cinema specifically, although little of his work had been translated for publication abroad. He also wrote books on Chinese, Korean, American and European films.

The international awareness of Sato's scholarship can be attributed to a collection of selected essays, Currents In Japanese Cinema, published internationally in English translation in 1982. His Kenji Mizoguchi and the Art of Japanese Cinema was published in Japanese in 1982 and translated in 2008. Sato has also frequently appeared as a primary source in the writing of other Japanese film historians, notably Donald Richie and Joan Mellen.

He was the president of the Japan Institute of the Moving Image.

Bibliography

References

1930 births
2022 deaths
People from Niigata (city)
Film theorists
Japanese film critics
Recipients of the Legion of Honour
Recipients of the Medal with Purple Ribbon
Film historians
People from Niigata Prefecture